A list of volcanoes in the United States and its territories.

Alaska

American Samoa

Arizona

California

Colorado

Hawaii

Idaho

Illinois

Louisiana

Michigan

Mississippi

Missouri

Nevada

New Hampshire

New Jersey

New Mexico

Northern Mariana Islands

Oregon

Texas

Utah

Virginia

Washington

Wyoming

See also
Geothermal energy in the United States
List of Cascade volcanoes
List of large volume volcanic eruptions in the Basin and Range Province
List of volcanoes in Canada    
List of volcanoes in Mexico
List of volcanoes in Russia
List of volcanic craters in Alaska
List of volcanic craters in Arizona
List of lava flows in Arizona
List of Yellowstone geothermal features

References

External links

 2018 Update to the U.S. Geological Survey National Volcanic Threat Assessment - maps and ratings for each potentially active volcano

 
Lists of landforms of the United States
United States of America
United States geology-related lists